In the sport of cricket, a batsman is said to have scored a century when they reach a score of 100 or more runs in an innings without being dismissed. In first-class cricket, the highest form of the game below international level, a total of 25 players have achieved the feat on a hundred or more occasions. For statistical purposes, any centuries scored in a Test match are included as first-class centuries (as shown in the Table below).

The first cricketer to achieve the feat was W. G. Grace, who completed his hundredth century in May 1895. Grace remains the only batsman to have achieved the feat and finish with a batting average below 40.

The English County Championship has historically always been the first-class competition in which the most matches are played per season, hence the most conducive competition to prolific run-scoring. Of the 25 men to have scored 100 first-class centuries, all have been either natively English or English-qualified except Donald Bradman of Australia, Zaheer Abbas of Pakistan, Glenn Turner of New Zealand and West Indian Viv Richards. Zaheer Abbas (Gloucestershire), Turner (Worcestershire) and Richards (Somerset) all had substantial county careers as overseas players; Bradman, the first non-English batsman to achieve the feat, therefore remains the only batsman to have done so despite never having played for an English county side.

Batsmen with 100 centuries or above 
Note: this list uses the figures accepted by the Wisden Cricketers' Almanack. For details on the difference between these figures and those used by other sources, see Variations in first-class cricket statistics.
Key

 100s denotes how many centuries the batsman scored in first-class cricket.
 Nation denotes the country for which the batsman played Test cricket was from; the number following indicates the number of centuries scored in Test cricket (in bold) plus the number of other first-class centuries scored for the national side.
 100th denotes the year in which the batsman scored his one-hundredth century in first-class cricket.
 ItH denotes how many innings it took the batsman to reach his hundredth century in first-class cricket.
 Inns denotes how many innings the batsman played.
 Runs denotes the number of runs scored by the batsman in his first-class career.
 Ave denotes the batsman's career batting average.
 ♠ denotes the batsman scored their hundredth century in a Test match.

References

General

Specific

External links

Lists of cricketers
First-class cricket records